The University of North Carolina Center for Public Media, branded on-air as PBS North Carolina or commonly PBS NC, is a public television network serving the state of North Carolina. It is operated by the University of North Carolina system, which holds the licenses for all but one of the thirteen PBS member television stations licensed in the state—WTVI (channel 42) in Charlotte is owned by Central Piedmont Community College. The broadcast signals of the twelve television stations cover almost all of the state, as well as parts of Georgia, South Carolina, Tennessee, and Virginia. The network's operations are located at the UNC Center for Public Television at Research Triangle Park between Raleigh and Durham.

History
WUNC-TV in Chapel Hill, the state network's flagship station, first signed on the air on January 8, 1955, as the second non-commercial educational television station located south of Washington, D.C.—one day after Cheaha, Alabama-licensed WCIQ-TV. Over the next twelve years, four more satellite stations signed on. WUND-TV in Edenton (originally WUNB-TV, licensed to Columbia) was the first of these satellites to debut on September 10, 1965, followed by the launches of WUNE-TV in Linville, WUNF-TV in Asheville, and WUNG-TV in Concord—all on September 11, 1967, and WUNJ-TV in Wilmington on June 4, 1971. This was supplemented with a network of translator stations in the Appalachian Mountains that also allowed the network's programming to reach across the entire state.

Five additional satellites debuted afterward: WUNK-TV in Greenville in May 1972, WUNL-TV in Winston-Salem in February 1973, WUNM-TV in Jacksonville in November 1982, WUNP-TV in Roanoke Rapids in October 1986, and WUNU-TV in Lumberton in September 1996. The state network's youngest station, WUNW in Canton, signed on in July 2010 to replace a translator that had served the area since the 1980s. The state network was branded on-air as North Carolina Public Television from 1979 to the mid-1990s, when it rebranded itself as University of North Carolina Television. It simplified the brand name to UNC-TV later in the 1990s; it had previously used that brand for most of the 1970s. On January 12, 2021, in recognition of PBS' growing online content delivery, the state network rebranded itself as "PBS North Carolina," while continuing to acknowledge its ties to the university system as being "Powered by the UNC System".

Programming 
The state network produces many programs of local interest, including the weeknightly public affairs program North Carolina Now, Our State, Carolina Outdoor Journal, Exploring North Carolina, North Carolina Bookwatch with D. G. Martin, and special programs about the state's history and culture. It also produces The Woodwright's Shop, Growing a Greener World, The Zula Patrol, and Song of the Mountains for national distribution. In addition to PBS and American Public Television programs and local productions, the station also runs programming from the United Kingdom, including "Britcoms" on Saturday evenings and the soap opera EastEnders on Sunday evenings. In the 1990s, UNC-TV introduced "Read-A-Roo," a kangaroo used as the mascot for the network's children's programming. PBS North Carolina airs its own public affairs programming on Sunday mornings.

Stations
PBS NC operates twelve stations that relay its programming across the entire state as well as into portions of Virginia, Tennessee, Georgia, and South Carolina.

Each station's callsign consists of "UN" for the University of North Carolina, followed by a letter assigned sequentially in the order in which it was activated, except for the first station.

Notes

Digital television

Digital channels
PBS NC's current over-the-air digital configuration, which is multiplexed among three subchannels, was introduced on September 25, 2008. On that date, UNC-TV revised its subchannel lineup on its stations, reducing the number of channels to three: UNC-TV (the main channel of each station, which now carries high definition programming), and the standard definition-only services UNC-KD and UNC-EX ("The Explorer Channel"). UNC-TV HD and UNC-EX are also available to DirecTV customers with MPEG4-compatible receivers. Prior to February 1, 2016, Time Warner Cable customers also received UNC-MX (described as "an eclectic mix of programming for adults") in standard definition; the North Carolina Channel has since replaced UNC-MX on Time Warner Cable systems. Prior to November 1, 2009, the third subchannel was named UNC-NC.

This configuration is used for WUNC, WUND, WUNF, WUNG, WUNJ, WUNK, WUNL, and WUNU:

An alternate configuration is used for WUNE, WUNM, WUNP, and WUNW. The original purpose for this was to obtain must-carry status for UNC-KD since those are secondary stations in their respective markets. On June 15, 2010, UNC-KD switched subchannels with UNC-EX on the four stations previously mentioned, which transferred UNC-KD's must-carry status to UNC-EX.

Subscribers of Charter Spectrum, the major cable provider in the state, have direct-fiber optic versions of each of PBS North Carolina's networks rather than an antenna feed of their local station, as Spectrum forerunner company Time Warner Cable built out a direct connection to PBS NC's studios at the RTP, a connection inherited by Spectrum parent Charter Communications when it merged with Time Warner Cable in 2016. 

Cable providers with a direct fiber optic link to UNC-TV (including Spectrum) formerly had exclusivity in carrying UNC-MX (formerly UNC-ED) on their digital tiers. UNC-MX featured a mix of how-to and public affairs programs, along with encore presentations of programs originally broadcast on main UNC-TV service. On February 1, 2016, UNC-MX was renamed UNC-NC "The North Carolina Channel" and was added over-the-air on DT-4, allowing full access to the service by over-the-air and non-Spectrum viewers.  On July 2, 2016, UNC-KD was rebranded as ROOTLE.

Prior to September 25, 2008, UNC-TV formerly operated four digital channels: in addition to the main signal on the primary channel, the second digital subchannel of each station carried UNC-HD (which carried PBS and regional programming in high-definition), the third subchannel carried UNC-KD (which carried children's programs), the fourth subchannel carried UNC-ED (an educational television service) and the fifth subchannel carried UNC-NC (centering on North Carolina public affairs and original local productions). Due to bandwidth limitations at the time, the over-the-air feed of UNC-HD was only available between 8-11 p.m., during which UNC-ED and UNC-NC ceased transmission in the interim. Cable systems with a direct fiber link to UNC-TV facilities aired all five channels on a 24-hour schedule.

On April 16, 2018, WRAY-TV and WLXI were merged onto WUNC's spectrum, after parent company Tri-State Christian Television (TCT) sold the stations' individual bandwidth in the 2016 FCC incentive auction. WUNC is the only station in the 12-station network that has a channel sharing agreement.

Analog-to-digital conversion
UNC-TV's stations shut down their analog signals on June 12, 2009, the official date in which full-power television stations in the United States transitioned from analog to digital broadcasts under federal mandate. The station's digital channel allocations pre- and post-transition are as follows:

All channels retained their original numbering for display to viewers via PSIP.

UNC-TV opted not to join other broadcasters in the Wilmington market in an early switch to digital-only broadcasts on September 8, 2008, nine months ahead of the national transition deadline. Following that date, WUNJ-TV became only full-power station in Wilmington that continued to broadcast an analog signal until the national digital transition on June 12, 2009.

ATSC 3.0
On March 22, 2021, WUNC-TV began broadcasting in ATSC 3.0, with a 1080p stream (virtual channel 4.11) on Capitol Broadcasting Company's host station WARZ-CD (now WNGT-CD). On June 29, 2021, WUNK-TV was converted to ATSC 3.0 with all sub-channels included. While a simulcast of WUNK-TV is shared on WUNM-TV, areas outside WUNM-TV are covered by other nearby network stations, thus the conversion did not result in any loss of over-the-air PBS service.

Translators
PBS NC operates 19 translators. Each translator is assigned to the license of a parent PBS NC full-power station, all of which simulcast the same network signal. Two directly repeat WUNC-TV, two directly repeat WUNE-TV, two directly repeat WUNG-TV, three directly repeat WUNL-TV, and 10 directly repeat WUNF-TV.

The 17 mountain-based translators serve as low-power, limited-area repeaters that bring the network's signal to towns in deep mountain valleys where the parent signal is blocked by the surrounding terrain. The translators of WUNC-TV act as digital replacement translators serving the few areas of the Triangle where WUNC-TV lost over-the-air coverage during the analog-digital conversion in 2009.

The following digital replacement translators rebroadcast WUNC-TV:
 Raleigh: WUNC-DRT
 Oxford: WUNC-DRT

The following translators rebroadcast WUNE-TV:
 Marion: W22FB-D
 Bat Cave: W29FE-D

The following translators rebroadcast WUNF-TV:
 Franklin (Wine Spring Bald): W19DB-D
 Andrews, etc.: W20EK-D
 Canton, etc.: W28EE-D
 Hayesville: W29DE-D
 Murphy: W31AN-D
 Franklin (Cowee Bald): W31DH-D
 Black Mountain: W33EH-D
 Highlands: W35CK-D
 Burnsville: W35CO-D

The following translators rebroadcast WUNG-TV:
 Tryon: W16DZ-D
 Jefferson: W30EF-D
 Spruce Pine: W31DI-D

The following translators rebroadcast WUNL-TV:
 Sparta: W15EF-D
 Boone: W27EK-D
 Zionville: W30CS-D

The licenses for translators in Bakersville (W42AX-D), Brevard (W19DD-D), Bryson City (W46AX-D), Cashiers (W42DF-D) and Cullowhee (W47DM-D) were surrendered to the Federal Communications Commission and cancelled on October 27, 2021. These were replaced with a distributed transmission system using the channel 27 frequency of WUNW.

Cable and satellite carriage
PBS NC is carried on all cable television providers in North Carolina. In Georgia, Kinetic TV carries WUNF in Blairsville. In South Carolina, Charter Spectrum carries WUNF in Greenville and Spartanburg, and WUNJ in Conway and Myrtle Beach. In Tennessee, Charter Spectrum carries WUNE and SkyBest TV carries WUNL, in Mountain City. In Virginia, WUND is carried by Cox Communications and Xfinity in the southern portion of the Hampton Roads market, WUNL is carried by Chatmoss Cablevision and Xfinity in Danville, and WUNP is carried on Xfinity in South Boston and South Hill.

On AT&T U-verse, DirecTV, and Dish Network, WUNC-TV, WUNG, WUNL, WUNF, WUND, WUNJ, and WUNU are carried on the respective local feeds for the Research Triangle, Charlotte, the Piedmont Triad, Greenville/Spartanburg/Asheville, Hampton Roads, Wilmington, and Florence/Myrtle Beach markets. In previous years, WUNL has also been carried on the Roanoke DirecTV feed; the Piedmont Triad market includes portions of western Virginia.

See also 
 North Carolina Public Radio

References

External links
PBS North Carolina official website

Affiliates of the University of North Carolina
Television channels and stations established in 1955
1955 establishments in North Carolina
PBS member networks
Television stations in North Carolina